Kim Oliver is a retired British actress. She is perhaps best known for her role as the prison inmate Buki Lester in the TV drama series Bad Girls.

Oliver is married to the musician Matthew Hales, who is more widely recognized under his stage name Aqualung.

Filmography

References

External links

Living people
English film actresses
English television actresses
Black British actresses
English people of Antigua and Barbuda descent
Year of birth missing (living people)